The Watkins 27, also known as the W27, is an American sailboat that was designed by naval architect Walter Scott and first built in 1977.

The Watkins 27 design was developed into the pilothouse Watkins 27P in 1981, although only seven of that model were built.

Production
The design was built by Watkins Yachts in Clearwater, Florida, United States from 1977 to 1984. During the first full year of production, 1978, the company delivered more than 160 of the model, although production dropped to about 100 boats in the following year, 1979. With 514 completed it became the company's most successful and longest model in production.

Design
The Watkins 27 is a recreational keelboat, built predominantly of polyester resin-based fiberglass, with teak wood trim. Plywood coring is used in the structures of the cabin roof, the deck, seats and cockpit sole for  additional stiffness. It has a masthead sloop rig with 6061-T6 aluminum spars, a raked stem, a vertical transom, a skeg-mounted rudder controlled by an Edson-built wheel and a centerboard with stub keel or optional fixed fin keel in deep or shoal lengths. It displaces  and carries  of ballast.

The fixed keel model was created by adding a shoe to the bottom of the centerboard stub keel and filling in the centerboard trunk. Even though the centerboard was standard and the fixed keel optional, mostly buyers specified the fixed shoal-draft keel and the centerboard and deep keel models are rare. Only five of the centerboard models were built.

The boat is fitted with a Japanese Yanmar diesel engine. A number of Yanmar engine models were used, including the YSB8, YSB12, YSE8, YSE12, YSM8, YSM12 and the  2QM. After 1980 the 1GM and 2GM models were employed.

Sleeping accommodation is provided for five people and consists of a bow "V" berth, a main cabin settee berth and a double-sized quarter berth. The head is fully enclosed and located to port aft of the forward cabin. The galley is aft, on the starboard side and includes an icebox and a two-burner alcohol or gas-fired stove mounted on gimbals. Ventilation is provided by six opening ports and two hatches, although some early boats delivered had two or more non-opening ports. The main cabin has  of standing headroom. All woodwork is teak, including the cabin accents, bulkheads and the cabinets, which are teak veneer over plywood. The cabin sole is a teak parquet design.

There is an anchor locker forward. The Edson pedestal-mounted wheel steering system drivings stainless steel cables, which rotate a quadrant that is bolted and keyed to the rudder post. The sail controls include a main sheet attached to the rear bridge deck on 1978 and 1979 models. After that the boats were delivered with mid-boom sheeting, using two blocks on either side of the cabin roof. The electrical system consists of two 12v batteries mounted in parallel and charged by the engine alternator.

Operational history
The boat is supported by an active class club, the Watkins Owners.

The design competed successfully in the market with the Catalina 27, offering better hardware and construction at similar price.

See also
List of sailing boat types

Related development
Watkins 27P

Similar sailboats
Aloha 27
Cal 27
Cal 2-27
Cal 3-27
Catalina 27
C&C 27
Crown 28
CS 27
Edel 820
Express 27
Fantasia 27
Halman Horizon
Hotfoot 27
Hullmaster 27
Hunter 27
Hunter 27-2
Irwin 27 
Island Packet 27
Mirage 27 (Perry)
Mirage 27 (Schmidt)
Mirage 275
O'Day 272
Orion 27-2

References

Keelboats
1970s sailboat type designs
Sailing yachts
Sailboat type designs by Walter Scott
Sailboat types built by Watkins Yachts